is a Japanese professional wrestler, mixed martial artist and kickboxer. As a martial artist, he competed in K-1, Pancrase Hybrid Wrestling (Pancrase) and Fighting Network RINGS. As a professional wrestler he competed in New Japan Pro-Wrestling (NJPW) and Inoki Genome Federation (IGF).

Mixed martial arts career

Pancrase Hybrid Wrestling
Yanagisawa joined Pancrase Hybrid Wrestling upon the formation of the company in 1993. He lost his first two fights to future legends Bas Rutten and Masakatsu Funaki. He then went on a four fight winning streak including a win over Vernon White but his win streak ended when he lost to another future MMA legend: Ken Shamrock. After the Shamrock fight, Yanagisawa entered Pancrase's 1995 Neo Blood Tournament where he made it to the finals before losing to Takafumi Ito. Following the loss, Yanagisawa would go winless for his next 5 fights including a draw with Guy Mezger, a loss to Frank Shamrock, and losses in rematches to Rutten and Funaki. Yanagisawa would snap his losing streak at Pancrase - Truth 3 in a victory over Larry Papadopoulos by submission but would then lose a rematch to Mezger. After that, Yanagisawa would go a three fight winning streak including victories over Vernon White by submission and a decision victory over UFC 6 tournament winner: Oleg Taktarov. After another loss to Mezger, Yanagisawa went on an 11 unbeaten streak including wins over future K-1 legend: Semmy Schilt and UFC 7 tournament runner-up: Paul Varelans before he lost once again to Mezger. On September 14, 1998, Yanaigisawa challenged Guy Mezger for the King of Pancrase Openweight Championship but lost by Decision. After one more victory, Yanagisawa would go winless for his last 9 fights in Pancrase (including a loss to future UFC Middleweight Champion: Evan Tanner) before leaving Pancrase in early 2000.

Fighting Network RINGS
In late 2000, Yanagisawa joined Fighting Network RINGS. On October 9, 2000, Yanagisawa entered RINGS' King of Kings tournament where he defeated Borislav Jeliazkov in the first round but lost to former UFC Heavyweight Champion: Randy Couture in the quarterfinals. Yanagisawa would go 1-2 in his next fights including losses to Bobby Hoffman and Fedor Emelianenko before leaving RINGS and MMA in late 2001.

Return to Pancrase and DEEP
In 2004, Yanagisawa returned to fighting at Pancrase - Brave 10 where he lost to Ryuta Noji by Decision. In 2009, Yanagisawa fought two more fights for DEEP but lost both fights.

Professional wrestling career
Yanagisawa debuted in wrestling in 1992 originally competing for Pro Wrestling Fujiwawa Gumi but made no impact on the promotion. By 1993, Yanagisawa left the promotion, following Masakatsu Funaki and Minoru Suzuki to Pancrase.

Ten years after debuting in wrestling, Yanagisawa returned to the sport when he joined New Japan Pro-Wrestling. He originally debuted on August 8, 2002 under a mask as he attacked Masahiro Chono. After unmasking, he joined Tadao Yasuda's Makai Club stable which feuded with New Japan. In November 2002, Yangisawa teamed with Yasuda and Makai #1 in the Triathlon Survivor Tournament but the group finished in last place with 1 point. On December 10, 2002, Yanagisawa teamed with Yasuda to challenge Cho-Ten for the IWGP Tag Team Championship but they lost.

At Wrestling World 2003, Yanagisawa entered the Young Generation Cup tournament. He would emerge victorious, defeating Kenzo Suzuki in the semi-finals and then Yutaka Yoshie in the finals to win the cup. On February 1, 2003, Yanagisawa entered the Teisen Hall Six Man Tag Team Tournament teaming with Makai #1 and Makai #2 but the team lost in the first round to eventual winners: Hiro Saito, Tatsutoshi Goto, and Shinsuke Nakamura. A few weeks later on February 16, Yanagisawa challenged Yoshihiro Takayama for the NWF Heavyweight Championship but came up short. After the NWF Title match, Yanagisawa largely went into the midcard for the next year and a half continuing to represent the Makai Club. After the Club broke up, Yanagisawa joined Masahiro Chono's new stable: Black New Japan. He continued to remain in the midcard with his only notable moment was when he competed in the 2005 New Japan Cup but lost in the first round to Koji Kanemoto. Yanagisawa would continue to compete in New Japan until leaving January 2006. Since leaving New Japan, Yanagisawa has wrestled once for Antonio Inoki's new promotion: Inoki Genome Federation on their December 20, 2007 show losing to Chris Moore (Chris Masters).

Championships and accomplishments

Mixed martial arts
Pancrase Hybrid Wrestling
1995 Neo-Blood Tournament Runner-up
1996 Pancrase Ranking Tournament Runner Up

Professional wrestling
New Japan Pro-Wrestling
Young Generation Cup (2003)

Mixed martial arts record

|-
| Loss
| align=center|24-25-9
| Lee Dool-Hee
| Decision (unanimous)
| Deep: Fan Thanksgiving Festival 2
| 
| align=center|2
| align=center|5:00
| Japan
| 
|-
| Loss
| align=center|24-24-9
| Bernard Ackah
| TKO (head kick & punches)
| Deep: 43 Impact
| 
| align=center|1
| align=center|0:07
| Japan
| 
|-
| Loss
| align=center|24-23-9
| Ryuta Noji
| Decision (unanimous)
| Pancrase: Brave 10
| 
| align=center|3
| align=center|5:00
| Japan
| 
|-
| Loss
| align=center|24-22-9
| Fedor Emelianenko
| Decision (unanimous)
| Rings: World Title Series 4
| 
| align=center|3
| align=center|5:00
| Japan
| 2001 RINGS Absolute Class Tournament Quarterfinals
|-
| Loss
| align=center|24-21-9
| Bobby Hoffman
| Decision (unanimous)
| Rings: World Title Series 1
| 
| align=center|2
| align=center|5:00
| Japan
| 
|-
| Win
| align=center|24-20-9
| Wataru Sakata
| Decision (split)
| Rings: King of Kings 2000 Final
| 
| align=center|2
| align=center|5:00
| Japan
| 
|-
| Loss
| align=center|23-20-9
| Ibragim Magomedov
| Decision (unanimous)
| S - Samurai 2000
| 
| align=center|N/A
| align=center|0:00
| Japan
| 
|-
| Loss
| align=center|23-19-9
| Randy Couture
| Decision (majority)
| Rings: King of Kings 2000 Block A
| 
| align=center|2
| align=center|5:00
| Japan
| King of Kings 2000 Block A Quarterfinal
|-
| Win
| align=center|23-18-9
| Borislav Jeliazkov
| Submission (toe hold)
| Rings: King of Kings 2000 Block A
| 
| align=center|1
| align=center|3:45
| Japan
| King of Kings 2000 Block A First Round
|-
| Loss
| align=center|22-18-9
| Sanae Kikuta
| Decision (unanimous)
| Pancrase - Trans 2
| 
| align=center|1
| align=center|15:00
| Japan
| 
|-
| Loss
| align=center|22-17-9
| Bob Stines
| TKO (punches)
| Pancrase - Breakthrough 10
| 
| align=center|1
| align=center|1:53
| Japan
| 
|-
| Draw
| align=center|22-16-9
| Akira Shoji
| Draw
| Pancrase - 1999 Anniversary Show
| 
| align=center|1
| align=center|15:00
| Japan
| 
|-
| Loss
| align=center|22-16-8
| Leon Dijk
| TKO (cut)
| Pancrase - 1999 Neo-Blood Tournament Second Round
| 
| align=center|1
| align=center|12:48
| Japan
| 
|-
| Draw
| align=center|22-15-8
| Takafumi Ito
| Draw
| Pancrase - Breakthrough 6
| 
| align=center|2
| align=center|3:00
| |Japan
| 
|-
| Loss
| align=center|22-15-7
| Jason DeLucia
| Decision (majority)
| Pancrase - Breakthrough 5
| 
| align=center|1
| align=center|15:00
| Japan
| 
|-
| Draw
| align=center|22-14-7
| Manabu Yamada
| Draw
| Pancrase - Breakthrough 3
| 
| align=center|1
| align=center|15:00
| Japan
| 
|-
| Draw
| align=center|22-14-6
| Satoshi Hasegawa
| Draw
| Pancrase - Breakthrough 2
| 
| align=center|2
| align=center|3:00
| Japan
| 
|-
| Loss
| align=center|22-14-5
| Evan Tanner
| Submission (arm-triangle choke)
| Pancrase - Advance 12
| 
| align=center|1
| align=center|2:24
| Japan
| 
|-
| Win
| align=center|22-13-5
| Kosei Kubota
| Submission (toe hold)
| Pancrase - Advance 11
| 
| align=center|1
| align=center|2:35
| Japan
| 
|-
| Loss
| align=center|21-13-5
| Guy Mezger
| Decision (lost points)
| Pancrase - 1998 Anniversary Show
| 
| align=center|1
| align=center|30:00
| Japan
| For King of Pancrase Openweight Championship
|-
| Draw
| align=center|21-12-5
| Yuki Kondo
| Draw (unanimous)
| Pancrase - 1998 Neo-Blood Tournament Second Round
| 
| align=center|1
| align=center|20:00
| Japan
| 
|-
| Draw
| align=center|21-12-4
| Keiichiro Yamamiya
| Draw (majority)
| Pancrase - Advance 8
| 
| align=center|2
| align=center|3:00
| Japan
| 
|-
| Win
| align=center|21-12-3
| Omar Bouiche
| Submission (achilles lock)
| Pancrase - Advance 6
| 
| align=center|1
| align=center|2:35
| Japan
| 
|-
| Win
| align=center|20-12-3
| Jason DeLucia
| Submission (toe hold)
| Pancrase - Advance 5
| 
| align=center|1
| align=center|12:44
| Japan
| 
|-
| Loss
| align=center|19-12-3
| Guy Mezger
| Decision (unanimous)
| Pancrase - Advance 4
| 
| align=center|1
| align=center|20:00
| Japan
| 
|-
| Draw
| align=center|19-11-3
| Keiichiro Yamamiya
| Draw (unanimous)
| Pancrase - Advance 2
| 
| align=center|1
| align=center|10:00
| Japan
| 
|-
| Win
| align=center|19-11-2
| Jason Godsey
| KO (knee)
| Pancrase - Advance 1
| 
| align=center|1
| align=center|3:14
| Japan
| 
|-
| Win
| align=center|18-11-2
| John Lober
| TKO (broken ankle)
| Pancrase: Alive 11
| 
| align=center|1
| align=center|0:55
| Japan
| 
|-
| Win
| align=center|17-11-2
| Les Johnston
| Submission (banana split)
| Pancrase: Alive 6
| 
| align=center|1
| align=center|8:35
| Japan
| 
|-
| Win
| align=center|16-11-2
| Paul Varelans
| Decision (lost points)
| Pancrase: Alive 4
| 
| align=center|1
| align=center|15:00
| Japan
| 
|-
| Win
| align=center|15-11-2
| Keiichiro Yamamiya
| Decision (lost points)
| Pancrase: Alive 3
| 
| align=center|1
| align=center|10:00
| Japan
| 
|-
| Win
| align=center|14-11-2
| Paul Lazenby
| Decision (lost points)
| Pancrase: Alive 2
| 
| align=center|1
| align=center|12:39
| Japan
| 
|-
| Win
| align=center|13-11-2
| Kim Jong-Wang
| Submission (achilles lock)
| Pancrase: Alive 1
| 
| align=center|1
| align=center|1:47
| Japan
| 
|-
| Win
| align=center|12-11-2
| Jack McGlaughlin
| Submission (Sugar Hold)
| Pancrase - Truth 10
| 
| align=center|1
| align=center|0:51
| Japan
| 
|-
| Draw
| align=center|11-11-2
| Takafumi Ito
| Draw (unanimous)
| Pancrase - Truth 8
| 
| align=center|1
| align=center|10:00
| Japan
| 
|-
| Win
| align=center|11-11-1
| Semmy Schilt
| Submission (achilles lock)
| Pancrase - Truth 7
| 
| align=center|1
| align=center|0:51
| Japan
| 
|-
| Loss
| align=center|10-11-1
| Guy Mezger
| Decision (unanimous)
| Pancrase - 1996 Anniversary Show
| 
| align=center|1
| align=center|20:00
| Japan
|
|-
| Loss
| align=center|10-10-1
| Kazuo Takahashi
| Decision (lost points)
| Pancrase - 1996 Neo-Blood Tournament, Round 1
| 
| align=center|1
| align=center|15:00
| Japan
| 
|-
| Win
| align=center|10-9-1
| Takaku Fuke
| Decision (lost points)
| Pancrase - Truth 6
| 
| align=center|1
| align=center|15:00
| Japan
| 
|-
| Win
| align=center|9-9-1
| Oleg Taktarov
| Decision (lost points)
| Pancrase - Truth 5
| 
| align=center|1
| align=center|15:00
| Japan
| 
|-
| Loss
| align=center|8-9-1
| Guy Mezger
| KO (palm strikes)
| Pancrase - Truth 4
| 
| align=center|1
| align=center|12:21
| Japan
| 1996 Pancrase Ranking Tournament Finals
|-
| Win
| align=center|8-8-1
| Vernon White
| Submission (achilles lock)
| Pancrase - Truth 3
| 
| align=center|1
| align=center|12:47
| Japan
| 1996 Pancrase Ranking Tournament Semifinals
|-
| Win
| align=center|7-8-1
| Larry Papadopoulos
| Submission (achilles lock)
| Pancrase - Truth 3
| 
| align=center|1
| align=center|3:21
| Japan
| 1996 Pancrase Ranking Tournament First Round 
|-
| Loss
| align=center|6-8-1
| Frank Shamrock
| Decision (lost points)
| Pancrase - Truth 2
| 
| align=center|1
| align=center|20:00
| Japan
| 
|-
| Loss
| align=center|6-7-1
| Masakatsu Funaki
| Technical Submission (keylock)
| Pancrase - Truth 1
| 
| align=center|1
| align=center|8:42
| Japan
| 
|-
| Loss
| align=center|6-6-1
| Bas Rutten
| Submission (rear-naked choke)
| Pancrase - Eyes Of Beast 7
| 
| align=center|1
| align=center|27:35
| Japan
| 
|-
| Draw
| align=center|6-5-1
| Guy Mezger
| Draw (unanimous)
| Pancrase - Eyes Of Beast 6
| 
| align=center|1
| align=center|10:00
| Japan
| 
|-
| Loss
| align=center|6-5
| Jason DeLucia
| Submission (triangle choke)
| Pancrase - 1995 Anniversary Show
| 
| align=center|1
| align=center|2:25
| Japan
| 
|-
| Loss
| align=center|6-4
| Takafumi Ito
| Decision (majority)
| Pancrase - 1995 Neo-Blood Tournament Second Round
| 
| align=center|1
| align=center|30:00
| Tokyo, Japan
| 1995 Neo-Blood Tournament Final
|-
| Win
| align=center|6-3
| Gregory Smit
| Submission (rear naked choke)
| Pancrase - 1995 Neo-Blood Tournament Second Round
| 
| align=center|1
| align=center|7:30
| Tokyo, Japan
| 1995 Neo-Blood Tournament Second Round
|-
| Win
| align=center|5-3
| Christopher DeWeaver
| Submission (kimura)
| Pancrase - 1995 Neo-Blood Tournament Opening Round
| 
| align=center|1
| align=center|3:38
| Tokyo, Japan
| 1995 Neo-Blood Tournament First Round
|-
| Loss
| align=center|4-3
| Ken Shamrock
| Submission (heel hook)
| Pancrase - Pancrash! 3
| 
| align=center|1
| align=center|7:30
| Japan
| 
|-
| Win
| align=center|4-2
| Todd Bjornethun
| Submission (heel hook)
| Pancrase - Pancrash! 2
| 
| align=center|1
| align=center|7:12
| Japan
| 
|-
| Win
| align=center|3-2
| James Mathews
| Submission (armbar)
| Pancrase - Pancrash! 1
| 
| align=center|1
| align=center|2:58
| Japan
| 
|-
| Win
| align=center|2-2
| Vernon White
| TKO (lost points)
| Pancrase: Yes, We Are Hybrid Wrestlers 4
| 
| align=center|1
| align=center|8:55
| Japan
| 
|-
| Win
| align=center|1-2
| Andre van den Oetelaar
| Submission (heel hook)
| Pancrase: Yes, We Are Hybrid Wrestlers 3
| 
| align=center|1
| align=center|15:51
| Japan
| 
|-
| Loss
| align=center|0-2
| Masakatsu Funaki
| Submission (kneebar)
| Pancrase: Yes, We Are Hybrid Wrestlers 2
| 
| align=center|1
| align=center|1:35
| Japan
| 
|-
| Loss
| align=center|0-1
| Bas Rutten
| KO (palm strike)
| Pancrase: Yes, We Are Hybrid Wrestlers 1
| 
| align=center|1
| align=center|0:43
| Tokyo, Japan
|

Kickboxing record

Legend:

See also
List of male mixed martial artists

References

External links
 

1972 births
Living people
Japanese male mixed martial artists
Heavyweight mixed martial artists
Mixed martial artists utilizing kickboxing
Mixed martial artists utilizing wrestling
Japanese male kickboxers
Heavyweight kickboxers
Japanese male professional wrestlers
People from Aomori (city)